Micracis is a genus of typical bark beetles in the family Curculionidae. There are more than 60 described species in Micracis.

Species
These 63 species belong to the genus Micracis:

 Micracis aculeatus LeConte, 1868
 Micracis acutipennis Eichhoff, 1878b
 Micracis amplinis Wood, 1971
 Micracis asperulus LeConte, 1878b
 Micracis bicornus Blackman, 1920a
 Micracis biorbis Blackman, 1920a
 Micracis burgosi Wood, 1982a
 Micracis carinulata Wood, 1960b
 Micracis carinulatus Wood, 1960
 Micracis carinulus Wood, 1969b
 Micracis costaricensis Wood, 1969b
 Micracis cubensis Blackman, 1928a
 Micracis detenta Wood, 1969b
 Micracis detentus Wood, 1969b
 Micracis difficilis Schedl, 1965c
 Micracis dimorphus Schedl
 Micracis evanescens Wood, 1956a
 Micracis exilis Wood, 1971
 Micracis festiva Wood, 1969b
 Micracis festivus Wood, 1969b
 Micracis giganteus Schedl
 Micracis grandis Schedl, 1948h
 Micracis harnedi Blackman, 1920a
 Micracis harunganae Schedl
 Micracis hirtellus Leconte, 1876
 Micracis ignotus Schedl, 1965c
 Micracis incerta Wood, 1971
 Micracis incertus Wood, 1971
 Micracis inimicus Wood, 1969b
 Micracis knulli Blackman, 1943a
 Micracis langstoni Blackman
 Micracis lepida Wood, 1969b
 Micracis lepidus Wood, 1969b
 Micracis lignator Blackman, 1928
 Micracis lignicolus Wood, 1969b
 Micracis longula Nunberg, 1956a
 Micracis madagascariensis Schedl
 Micracis meridianus Blackman, 1920a
 Micracis mexicanus Schedl, 1948h
 Micracis minimus Wood, 2007
 Micracis nanula Leconte, 1876
 Micracis opacicollis LeConte, 1878b
 Micracis opacithorax Schedl, 1940a
 Micracis ovata Wood, 1956a
 Micracis ovatus Wood, 1956a
 Micracis pennatus Schedl, 1965c
 Micracis photophilus Wood, 1956a
 Micracis populi Blackman, 1920a
 Micracis punctatorugosus Schedl, 1948h
 Micracis pygmaeus Schedl, 1948h
 Micracis robustus Schedl, 1948h
 Micracis rudis Leconte, 1876
 Micracis senta Wood, 1971
 Micracis sentus Wood, 1971
 Micracis suturalis LeConte, 1868
 Micracis swainei Blackman, 1920
 Micracis torus Wood, 1971
 Micracis tribulata Wood, 1969b
 Micracis tribulatus Wood, 1969b
 Micracis tropicus Wood, 2007
 Micracis truncatus Wood, 1956a
 Micracis unicornis Wood, 1969b
 Micracis vitulus Wood, 1971

References

Further reading

 
 
 

Scolytinae
Curculionidae genera
Taxa named by John Lawrence LeConte
Articles created by Qbugbot